Dominik Martišiak (born 9 July 2000) is a Slovak footballer who plays as winger for MFK Vítkovice on loan from FK Senica in Slovak Super Liga.

Club career

FK Senica
Martišiak is an alumnus of Senica's academy. He made a debut for Senica's senior team during a 1–0 victory, substituting Adam Pajer during the stoppage time of the second half. He made the debut before the age of 17, being one of the youngest debutants in the history of the competition.

Nonetheless, in the subsequent two seasons he spent at the club, Martišiak only made sporadic appearance, usually as a substitute, tallying a total of only 9 games. He mostly played in the U19 squad. 

Still, in December 2017, he was on a 4 day trial in Scottish Dundee United.

Baník Ostrava
On 19 May 2019, Senica announced on its official Facebook page that Martišiak would leave the club and join Baník Ostrava, starting with the new season. He was immediately loaned out to Czech club MFK Vítkovice for the 2019-20 season.

References 

2000 births
Living people
Slovak footballers
Slovak expatriate footballers
Association football wingers
Slovak Super Liga players
Czech National Football League players
FK Senica players
FC Baník Ostrava players
MFK Vítkovice players
Slovak expatriate sportspeople in the Czech Republic
Expatriate footballers in the Czech Republic